New Fairview is a city in Wise County, Texas, United States. The population was 1,386 in 2020. Growing from a settlement called Illinois Community, the city was called Fairview until 1999, when it was changed to distinguish it from several other Fairviews in Texas. In order to maintain a quieter, more rural atmosphere, residential lots are legally limited to a minimum size of 1 acre.

Geography

New Fairview is located at  (33.110028, –97.457571).

Demographics

As of the 2020 United States census, there were 1,386 people, 415 households, and 306 families residing in the city.

Education
The city of New Fairview is served by two Independent School Districts – Northwest and Decatur.

References

External links
 City of New Fairview – Official site

Cities in Texas
Cities in Wise County, Texas
Dallas–Fort Worth metroplex